FarSight Studios (formerly Farsight Technologies) is an American video game developer established in 1988 by Jay Obernolte. They are an official licensed developer for all current home and handheld consoles including the Sony PlayStation 4, PlayStation 3 and Move, PlayStation 2, PSP, and PlayStation Vita; the Microsoft Xbox, Xbox 360, and Kinect; as well as the Nintendo Wii, Wii U, DS, and 3DS. In September 2018, FarSight announced that they will also be developing several pinball tables for the Oculus Rift.

The company is best known for its pinball games that focus on virtual recreations of classic pinball machines, such as The Pinball Arcade. It was announced in May 2018 that FarSight will no longer produce games licensed from Williams and Bally, leading to a loss of over 50 trademarked tables from their Pinball Arcade catalog and announced they will focus mainly on tables under the Stern Pinball license.

Games 

This is a sortable table of computer and video games produced by FarSight Studios, in alphabetical order.

See also 
Jay Obernolte

References

External links 

1988 establishments in California
American companies established in 1988
Companies based in San Bernardino County, California
Video game companies based in California
Video game companies established in 1988
Video game development companies